Alexander (Sasha) Viacheslavovich Zhulin (born 20 July 1963) is a Russian ice dancing coach and former competitor. With Maya Usova, he is a two-time Olympic medalist (1994 silver, 1992 bronze), the 1993 World champion, and the 1993 European champion. They also won gold medals at Skate America, NHK Trophy, Nations Cup, and Winter Universiade. They represented the Soviet Union, the Unified Team, and Russia.

Competitive career 
Coach Natalia Dubova paired him with Maya Usova in 1980. In 1988, they made their first appearance at the European Championships, placing fourth. The next season, they won silver at the 1989 European Championships in Birmingham, England and silver in their World Championships debut, in Paris. The next two seasons, they took bronze at Worlds.

At the 1991 World Championships in Munich, Germany, they were very close to winning. They led after both the compulsory dances and original dance (although finishing 2nd in the original dance portion), and in the free dance received 4 1st place ordinals from the 9 judges. Nonetheless, a strange ordinal situation led to them finishing only 3rd in the free dance and dropping to 3rd overall behind the Duchensays and Klimova and Ponomarenko.

In the 1991–92 season, Usova/Zhulin won silver at the 1992 European Championships in Lausanne, Switzerland and then captured their first Olympic medal, bronze, at the 1992 Winter Olympics in Albertville, France. Usova/Zhulin ended their season with silver at the 1992 World Championships in Oakland, California. They moved with Dubova from Moscow to Lake Placid, New York in September 1992.

In the 1992–93 season, Usova/Zhulin won the 1993 European Championships in Helsinki and the 1993 World Championships in Prague.

The next season, they were third at the 1994 European Championships in Copenhagen, behind Jayne Torvill / Christopher Dean and Oksana Grishuk / Evgeni Platov.   They had been sitting in 1st place and seemingly ensured the title as Grishuk & Platov were mathematically out of gold medal contention, after Torvill & Dean were placed behind them in the free dance 5 judges to 4.  However Grishuk & Platov won the free dance and changed the ordinals between Usova & Zhulin, and Torvill & Dean, dropping Usova & Zhulin to a 3rd-place finish. This loss seemed to indicate a loss of their #1 Russian status and instilled fear in their chances for the Olympic Gold medal. Their new free program to a collection of Nina Rota tunes also received negative reviews from fans and judges alike as it was a sharp departure from their previous work, and many critics felt it did not suit their sensual and elegant style.

At the 1994 Winter Olympics in Lillehammer, Norway, they won the silver medal behind Grishuk/Platov.  They tied for 1st place with Grishuk & Platov in the compulsory dances, and went into the free dance tied for overall 1st with Torvill & Dean who won the original dance, setting up an intense 3-way battle for gold.  Unlike the Europeans all 3 teams in position to win gold simply by winning the free dance.  In the free dance they received 3 1st place ordinals and 6 2nd place ordinals, but lost the gold to Grishuk & Platov who received 5 1st place ordinals, 1 2nd place ordinal, and 3 3rd place ordinals, losing the free dance and gold based on the majority rule, despite having no judges place them 3rd and a lower total of ordinals than Grishuk & Platov. Had 1 of 3 judges changed their mark by .1 Usova & Zhulin would have won the gold. Upset about the controversial Olympic loss, Usova & Zhulin withdrew from the 1994 World Figure Skating Championships, which they had intended to be their final competitive event.

Usova/Zhulin skated together professionally from 1994 to 1997. They toured with Champions on Ice and won the World Professional Championships. Zhulin then skated with former rival, Oksana Grishuk, for one year. His former partner, Maya Usova, would compete for many years with former rival, Evgeni Platov.

Further career 

After retiring, Zhulin became a skating coach and choreographer. He coached in New Jersey before moving back to Russia in 2006. He is based in Moscow and often coaches in collaboration with Oleg Volkov. Zhulin has also been involved in Russian ice shows, such as Ice Age.

Among others, Zhulin has coached:
 Tatiana Navka / Roman Kostomarov, the 2006 Olympic champions. Coached from 2000 to end of career.
 Nathalie Péchalat / Fabian Bourzat, the 2011 and 2012 European champions. Coached from July 2008 to April 2011.
 Elena Ilinykh / Nikita Katsalapov, the 2010 World Junior champions. Coached until the end of the 2010–2011 season.
 Naomi Lang / Peter Tchernyshev, from 2000 to 2002.
 Julia Zlobina / Alexei Sitnikov, from mid-2011 to mid-2013.
 Alisa Agafonova / Alper Uçar, from December 2012 to December 2015.
 Alexandra Nazarova / Maxim Nikitin, from mid-2013 to June 2016.
 Ksenia Monko / Kirill Khaliavin, from February 2012 to 2015.
 Tiffany Zahorski / Jonathan Guerreiro from June 2014 to May 2017
 Valeria Zenkova / Valerie Sinitsin, from mid-2011 to 2014.
His current students include:
 Ekaterina Bobrova / Dmitri Soloviev, from 25 April 2012 (2013 World bronze medalists).
 Sara Hurtado / Kirill Khaliavin, from 2016.
 Victoria Sinitsina / Nikita Katsalapov, from the end of the 2016–17 season (2021 World Champions, 2020 European Champions, 2019 World Silver Medalists, 2018 Grand Prix Final Silver Medalists).
 Viktoria Kavaliova / Yurii Bieliaiev
 Maria Stavitskaia / Andrei Bagin

Personal life 
Zhulin married Maya Usova in 1986 but the two eventually divorced. He was romantically involved with competitive rival Oksana Grishuk. In 2000, he married Tatiana Navka, with whom he has a daughter, Sasha, born in May 2000.

Zhulin became an American citizen in 2006. In April 2010, he and Navka filed for divorce. He married Natalia Mikhailova in August 2018. Their daughter, Ekaterina, was born  on 10 January 2013 in Moscow.

In 2021, he connected the COVID-19 pandemic to the Black Lives Matter movement and transgender athletes, saying "the world is going to hell".

Programs

With Usova

With Grishuk

Amateur career 
With Usova
 Soviet Union (URS): Start of career through December 1991
 Commonwealth of Independent States (CIS): 1992 European and World Championships
 Unified Team at the Olympics (EUN): 1992 Olympics
 Russia (RUS): 1992–93 to end of career

References

External links 

 Zhulin_site

Navigation 

1963 births
Living people
Russian male ice dancers
Soviet male ice dancers
Figure skaters at the 1992 Winter Olympics
Figure skaters at the 1994 Winter Olympics
Russian figure skating coaches
Olympic silver medalists for Russia
Olympic bronze medalists for the Unified Team
Olympic figure skaters of the Unified Team
Olympic figure skaters of Russia
Figure skaters from Moscow
Olympic medalists in figure skating
World Figure Skating Championships medalists
European Figure Skating Championships medalists
Medalists at the 1992 Winter Olympics
Medalists at the 1994 Winter Olympics
Universiade medalists in figure skating
Goodwill Games medalists in figure skating
Recipients of the Order "For Merit to the Fatherland", 4th class
Universiade gold medalists for the Soviet Union
Universiade silver medalists for the Soviet Union
Competitors at the 1985 Winter Universiade
Competitors at the 1987 Winter Universiade
Competitors at the 1990 Goodwill Games